Knefastia sainti is an extinct species of sea snail, a marine gastropod mollusk in the family Pseudomelatomidae, the turrids and allies.

Description

Distribution

References

sainti
Gastropods described in 1899